Richard William Leslie Wain VC (5 December 1896 – 20 November 1917) was a Welsh recipient of the Victoria Cross, the highest and most prestigious award for gallantry in the face of the enemy that can be awarded to British and Commonwealth forces.

Details
Wain was born in Penarth near Cardiff, Wales to Florence E. Wain and Harris Wain. He was educated at The Cathedral School, Llandaff and then at Penarth Grammar School and St Bees Grammar School, where he was a member of the Officers Training Corps. On the outbreak of the Great War, despite having won a scholarship to attend Oxford University, he joined the Territorial Army.  He was commissioned into the Manchester Regiment on 16 July 1915 and served in France.

He was wounded on 1 July 1916 on the opening day of the battle of the Somme. He was serving as an officer of 17th Battalion of the Manchester Regiment; his unit suffering severe casualties as they successfully captured the village of Montauban.  Wain served in A Company and was badly wounded as he led his men forward.  He joined the Heavy Section of the Machine Gun Corps and was allocated to A Battalion.  His unit, which was equipped with tanks, took part in the Battle of Messines in June 1917; Wain's tank reaching its final objective and destroying a number of German machine guns which were in a concrete emplacement.

He was 20 years old, and a section commander and acting captain in A Battalion, Tank Corps, when he was posthumously awarded a Victoria Cross for his actions on 20 November 1917 at Marcoing, near Cambrai, France, during the battle of Cambrai (1917). His tank took a direct hit killing all but him and one member of his crew. Though severely wounded he rushed an enemy strong point with a Lewis gun capturing it and taking about half the garrison prisoners. His actions allowed the infantry, which had been pinned back by the machine gun post, to advance. He was killed shortly afterwards while continuing to fire on the retiring enemy.

Citation

Memorials
Wain has no known grave.

References

External links 
 

1896 births
1917 deaths
People from Penarth
People educated at St Bees School
British World War I recipients of the Victoria Cross
Royal Tank Regiment officers
British Army personnel of World War I
British military personnel killed in World War I
Manchester Regiment officers
People educated at Stanwell School
British Army recipients of the Victoria Cross
Welsh recipients of the Victoria Cross
People educated at The Cathedral School, Llandaff
Welsh military personnel